The England cricket team toured the West Indies in February and March 2017 to play three One Day International (ODI) matches. England won the series 3–0 and was the first time that England had whitewashed the West Indies in an ODI series in the West Indies.

Squads

David Willey was ruled out of the tour following an operation on his shoulder, with Steven Finn named as his replacement. Alex Hales was added to England's squad after he recovered from a hand fracture. Ahead of the ODI matches, the West Indies reduced their squad from fifteen players to thirteen, dropping Shane Dowrich and Miguel Cummins. However, Cummins was added back in the West Indies squad for the third ODI as a replacement for Shannon Gabriel, who was ruled out due to a side strain he suffered in the 2nd ODI.
Tom Curran was added to England's squad as a back-up for Jake Ball, who suffered a knee injury during the second tour match.

Tour matches

List A match: UWI Vice Chancellor's XI v England

List A match: West Indies Cricket Board President's XI v England

ODI series

1st ODI

2nd ODI

3rd ODI

References

External links
 Series home at ESPN Cricinfo

2017 in English cricket
2017 in West Indian cricket
International cricket competitions in 2016–17
English cricket tours of the West Indies